Colin Stevens (born 17 October 1943) is a New Zealand cricketer. He played in three first-class matches for Canterbury from 1966 to 1968.

See also
 List of Canterbury representative cricketers

References

External links
 

1943 births
Living people
New Zealand cricketers
Canterbury cricketers
Cricketers from Christchurch